Westbrook–Ardmore Historic District is a national historic district located at Wilmington, New Hanover County, North Carolina. The district encompasses 467 contributing buildings in a predominantly residential section of Wilmington.  The district developed as six interrelated early-20th century subdivisions between about 1914 and 1956 and includes notable examples of Colonial Revival and Bungalow / American Craftsman style architecture.  Notable buildings include St. Matthew's Evangelical Lutheran Church (1942), Central Church of Christ (c. 1956), Saint Mark Freewill Baptist Church (c. 1945), the Mills Store (1947), "English Cottage Style" former Pure Oil station (1936), and Art Moderne style Traveler's Service Station #3 (c. 1951).

It was listed on the National Register of Historic Places in 2009.

References

Houses on the National Register of Historic Places in North Carolina
Historic districts on the National Register of Historic Places in North Carolina
Colonial Revival architecture in North Carolina
National Register of Historic Places in New Hanover County, North Carolina